"A Long Walk" is a song released in 2001 by American recording artist Jill Scott, from her debut studio album, Who Is Jill Scott? Words and Sounds Vol. 1. The song peaked at No. 9 on Billboards R&B Singles chart. It was sampled on the track "Stimulation" from Disclosure's 2013 album Settle.

Track listing
UK CD" single

Charts

Weekly charts

Year-end charts

References

External links
 

Jill Scott (singer) songs
Songs written by Andre Harris
Song recordings produced by Dre & Vidal
2000 songs
Songs written by Jill Scott (singer)
Hidden Beach Recordings singles
2000 singles